Frank C. Cook (June 9, 1963 – August 19, 2009) was an American ethnobotanist, humanitarian, and educator who traveled the world studying plants and learning from the healers of various traditions while offering classes   with a unique exchange model of 'give what you can; receive what you need'.

Personal life 
Cook considered himself a citizen of the world. He touched a large number of people and instilled in them a deep love of the natural world as well as an empowered sense of self.

Cook's life and passion for living consciously and simply led him to become a repository for plant knowledge. He studied internationally with herbalists, shamans, vaidyas, green witches, doctors, professors, and medicine men and women around the world who initiated him into many ways of understanding plants as medicine. During that time, Cook led hundreds of workshops on re-skilling, specifically through plant identification and botanical family relations. He facilitated mead circles; taught at schools and in homes, gardens and the woods; spoke at conferences; and played a prominent role at educational gatherings around the world.

He was a phenomenal teacher. After hearing Frank share his way of seeing the world, many were inspired to connect with nature in some way – to eat something wild every day, let their food be their medicine, practice simple living, show up on plant walks, make mead and wild ferments, or create their own herbal remedies for the family.

Cook taught about the edible plants in yards and woods. He showed people what plants were medicine and gave medicines he had made from them. He awakened a vibrant herbal movement and graced communities with old knowledge of traditional healers, reminding people to appreciate the whole plant and see plants as allies. He encouraged the pursuit of locally abundant analogue plants to replace the endangered, over-harvested species of the world and to walk the green path.

However, Cook did more than just enlighten people about plants. He expanded minds and aroused higher consciousness through his travel journals, his botany talks, and his way of living by donation and by taking people to their edges and asking questions such as, "What plants will be with us in this planetary culture rising?", "How will people show up to help their community transition into these changing times?", and "How can we best move forward?"

He firmly believed that we are in the midst of great changes on the planet and that it is our awareness and daily choices that will determine what quality of a future we have as people of one interconnected world. Cook spoke often of how we were quickly becoming one world. His central questions in this respect were: "What plants will be in our global gardens and stories?" "What will our global healing system look like?" "What are the roles of the human species in the web of life?"

Cook was very much engaged in a multitude of projects when he passed, full of visions, work and inspiration. He was known to say, "I am done with end users," meaning that as we learned this knowledge and way of being he was teaching, it was now our responsibility to pass it on.

Cook died of an advanced case of neurocysticercosis,  which formed cystic lesions in his brain.

Teaching 
From the late 1990s until his death, Cook studied and taught with a wide range of well-known and respected plant teachers including: Dr. James A. Duke, 7Song, Doug Elliott, Alan Muskat, Juliet Blankespoor, Chuck Marsh, Christopher Hobbs, CoreyPine Shane, Greenlight, Daniel Nicholson, John Olmstead, and Sandor Katz.

Cook also taught at the Appalachia School of Holistic Herbalism in Asheville, NC as well as online classes using the book Botany in a Day, workshops abroad  and led plant walks at Wild Roots and Rainbow Gatherings.

Green Path 
Cook also taught at yearly Rainbow Gatherings and founded Green Path in 2006.

Travel 
Frank Cook was well traveled, visiting Costa Rica, Southern Africa, Peru, Australia, New Zealand, Japan, and more.

Legacy 
Frank Cook's life sowed the seeds for the non-profit organization Plants and Healers International which works to "network people together regionally and globally for plant walks, transition skills, green path gatherings, and travel to indigenous cultures".

Publications 
 Betsy Breaks her Nose
 If Six Became Nine
 Toothpick Heaven
 A Baker's Dozen
 Plants and Healers of India and Nepal
 Plants and Healers of Peru and Ecuador
 Plants and Healers of South Africa
 Emerging Planetary Medicine
 He was also a contributor to the cookbook Kind Veggie Burritos

References

External links 
Plants and Healers
Audio and video of Frank Cook.

1963 births
2009 deaths
Ethnobotanists